72nd meridian may refer to:

72nd meridian east, a line of longitude east of the Greenwich Meridian
72nd meridian west, a line of longitude west of the Greenwich Meridian